Benoît Guy Robert Costil (born 3 July 1987) is a French professional footballer who plays as a goalkeeper for  club Lille and the France national team.

Costil also is a French international, having represented his nation at under-21 and senior level. He represented his country at UEFA Euro 2016, in the same year as his senior international debut. Costil won the 2021 UEFA Nations League Finals with France.

Club career

Early career
Born in Caen, Calvados, Costil started his career at Caen in Ligue 1 but only made a 10 performances for the club before being sent on loan in the 2008–09 season to Vannes in Ligue 2.

On 17 June 2009, Sedan signed Costil from Caen until June 2011. In two years at Sedan he made 76 appearances and was elected best goalkeeper of Ligue 2 for the 2010–11 season.

Rennes
On 14 June 2011, he signed a three-year contract for Rennes after his contract with Sedan expired. This transfer meant he returned to Ligue 1 for the first time since the handful of appearances he made at Caen at the beginning of his career.

Bordeaux
In 2017, Costil joined Bordeaux. In July 2019, he extended contract until 2022 and was named the team captain. However, following the signing of Laurent Koscielny, he was relegated to vice-captain.  In 2022, Costil confirmed his departure from Bordeaux.

Auxerre
On 16 July 2022, newly promoted Ligue 1 team Auxerre announced the signing of Costil for free, on a one-year deal.

International career
Costil was a France U-21 international having participated in the 2008 Toulon Tournament.

On 6 November 2014, Costil was called up to France manager Didier Deschamps' 23-man squad for friendly matches against Albania and Sweden.

On 12 May 2016, Costil was called up to France manager Didier Deschamps' 23-man squad for UEFA Euro 2016 as the third goalkeeper behind captain Hugo Lloris and Steve Mandanda. His team won the silver medal in the competition, after losing to Portugal 0–1 in final game, but he did not appear in the tournament.

He made his debut on 15 November against Ivory Coast, playing the whole game, also captaining his side in a 0–0 home draw. He kept the first clean sheet.

On 17 May 2018, he was included in a preliminary 35-man French squad for the 2018 FIFA World Cup in Russia alongside Anthony Martial, but did not make the final 23.

In September 2018, after Steve Mandanda injury, Deschamps called Costil to national team matches against Germany and Netherlands in UEFA Nations League.

In October 2021, he became UEFA Nations League champion with the national team.

Career statistics

International

Honours
France
UEFA Nations League: 2020–21
UEFA European Championship runner-up: 2016

References

External links

1987 births
Living people
Footballers from Caen
French footballers
Association football goalkeepers
Stade Malherbe Caen players
Vannes OC players
CS Sedan Ardennes players
Stade Rennais F.C. players
FC Girondins de Bordeaux players
AJ Auxerre players
Lille OSC players
Ligue 2 players
Ligue 1 players
France youth international footballers
France under-21 international footballers
France international footballers
UEFA Euro 2016 players
UEFA Nations League-winning players